Dissidenten are a German rock band known for their collaborations with Middle Eastern, African and Indian musicians. In a 1988 article for The New York Times, music critic Stephen Holden acknowledged the band as being among the leaders of what he termed "the 'world beat' movement ... in which ethnic styles are contemporized with electronic dance rhythms".

History
Around 1981, "Embryo's Dissidenten" were founded in India by Friedemann "Friedo" Josch (b 21 July 1952, Mainz, wind instruments, keyboards) and former Embryo band members Uwe "Uve" Müllrich (b 7 December 1947, Rügen, bass, oud, guitar, vocals) and Michael Wehmeyer (keyboards, piano). Still in 1981, Marlon Klein (b 13 December 1957, Herford, drums, perc, keyboards, vocals) replaced Wehmeyer, and the band renamed themselves to Dissidenten. 1982/83, they founded their own record label Exil in Berlin.

Following a one-year tour of Asia, the group decided to stay in India to produce their first album Germanistan, with the help of the Karnataka College of Percussion, female singer R.A. Ramamani and percussionist Ramesh Shotham. The live line-up was joined by Indian pianist Louis Banks and American saxophonist Charlie Mariano. Concerts in Calcutta, Madrid, Casablanca and Stockholm are documented on the live album Germanistan Tour 83.

They then moved on to Morocco to record Sahara Elektrik in 1982 at the Palace of Abdesalam Akaaboune in Tangier with the help of friend Paul Bowles and local sha'abi band Lem Chaheb. The track "Fata Morgana" became a dance hit in Europe (especially Spain and Italy) and Canada, and the group toured worldwide.

In 1986 the Dissidenten moved to Spain, producing Life At The Pyramids and began to receive recognition in the US and UK.

In 1989 they moved back to Morocco, recording Out Of This World with the Royal National Orchestra of Morocco, and other leading North African musicians including Cherif Lamrani and other members of Lem Chaheb. The album was released world wide and the band toured around the globe to promote it. In 1991, the album Live In New York was released, and the following year The Jungle Book was recorded, weaving recordings of Indian life into dance tracks.

In 1995, Klein stayed in the US to work as producer for two albums by singer Gary Wright, featuring George Harrison. In 1996, the group reunited to produce the album Instinctive Traveler, their first album with mostly English-language songs sung by Müllrich's daughter Bajka, which was followed by a tour of international festivals. Two years later they appeared at the Glastonbury festival and released their second live album, Live in Europe.

In 2000, with American composer Gordon Sherwood, video artist Stefanie Seidl and the Bratislava Orchestra under Petr Feranec they created The Memory of the Waters, a “documentary opera” about the River Danube, debut performed at the International Danube Music Festival in the city of Ulm. The following year, they issued an album of remixes, A World Beat Odyssey, which they then performed live with accompanying DJs.

In 2005, the opera "La Memoria de las Aguas" with the choir and orchestra of Pamplona under the direction of conductor Tomas Garridoand was broadcast by the Spanish National Radio at the Navarra Festival. In 2006 the group worked on a new Moroccan project, The Tanger Sessions, with the legendary Moroccan cult group Jil Jilala.

In 2007, Dissidenten toured North Africa with Jil Jilala. Between concerts they worked together in Tangier and Casablanca to complete The Tanger Sessions. Also in 2007, the band composed and arranged the musical program for the final party of Germany’s spectacular CREOLE-Award for World Music. French/German TV ARTE and German TV WDR broadcast a lengthy feature about Dissidenten’s Moroccan experiences, "The Hippie Trail".

In 2008, The Tanger Sessions was released and they toured Europe and North Africa. The first gig of the tour was broadcast live and online by German National Radio SWR in April 2008. Since summer 2008, Dissidenten & Jil Jilala performed live in Europe and North Africa. 2009 sees them again at various festivals around Europe/Northafrica and North America.

Discography
 Germanistan (1982)
 Sahara Elektrik (1983)
 Life At The Pyramids (1986) - Two versions of this album exist, The track "Telephone Arab" is completely redone.
 Out Of This World (1988)
 Live In New York (1991)
 The Jungle Book (1993)
 Mixed Up Jungle (1996)
 Instinctive Traveller (1997)
 Live In Europe (1998)
 2001: A Worldbeat Odyssey (2001)
 2003: A New World Odyssey (2003)
 Tanger Sessions (2008)
 How Long Is Now?- Unplugged in Berlin  (2013)
 The Memory Of The Waters - Live At Brucknerfest  (2014)
 "We Don't Shoot! - Live (2017)

References

External links
 Official website
 YouTube – "Fata Morgana" with collage of band images
 YouTube – "Fata Morgana" (original video) U.S. Radio Mix

German world music groups
German rock music groups
Musical groups established in 1981